For Kasey Chambers 2011 album of the same name, see Storybook.

Storybook is a 2004 album by Peter Jöback, recorded by the Gothenburg Symphony Orchestra.

Track listing
Nature Boy
Storybook
She (Tous les visages de l'amour)
The Windmills of Your Mind
Losing My Mind
I Don't Care Much
I Who Have Nothing (Uno dei tanti)
Always on My Mind
Summer Wine
The Sound Of Your Name (Ton nom)
Theme from "Schindler's List"
Live
Somewhere

Contributors
Peter Jöback - vocals
Martin Östergren  - piano)
André Ferrari, - drums
Fredrik Jonsson - bass
Nick Davies  - conductor
Gothenburg Symphony Orchestra  - musicians

Charts

Weekly charts

Year-end charts

References

2004 albums
Peter Jöback albums